The Conjugal Bed is a 1993 Romanian comedy film directed by Mircea Daneliuc. It was entered into the 43rd Berlin International Film Festival. The film was selected as the Romanian entry for the Best Foreign Language Film at the 66th Academy Awards, but was not accepted as a nominee.

Cast
 Gheorghe Dinică as Vasile Potop
 Coca Bloos as Carolina Potop
 Valentin Teodosiu Teodosiu
 Lia Bugnar as Stela
 Valentin Uritescu
 Geo Costiniu
 Jana Corea
 Flavius Constantinescu
 Nicolae Praida
 Paul Chiributa
 Eugen Cristian Motriuc (as Cristian Motriuc)
 Bujor Macrin
 Dumitru Palade

See also
 List of submissions to the 66th Academy Awards for Best Foreign Language Film
 List of Romanian submissions for the Academy Award for Best Foreign Language Film

References

External links

1993 films
1993 comedy films
1990s Romanian-language films
Films directed by Mircea Daneliuc
Romanian comedy films